Cercospora asparagi is a fungal plant pathogen.

References

asparagi
Fungal plant pathogens and diseases